Dale Hadley Vitt (born February 9, 1944) is an American bryologist and peatland ecologist, recognized as a leading expert on peatlands. From 1989 to 1991 he was the president of the American Bryological and Lichenological Society.

Biography
Dale Vitt grew up in Washington, Missouri in a financially struggling family due to the death of his father when Dale was eleven years old. After graduating from high school in 1962, he worked for a year at the McDonnell Aircraft Corporation (which was renamed in 1967 McDonnell Douglas) on manufacturing for Project Gemini. In autumn 1963 he matriculated at Southeast Missouri State University and graduated there with B.S. in December 1966. He then matriculated at the University of Michigan and graduated in 1967 with M.S. and in 1970 with Ph.D. His doctoral dissertation, supervised by Howard A. Crum, is entitled "The Family Orthotrichaceae (Musci) in North America, North of Mexico".  While still a graduate student, in the winter of 1969–1970 Vitt went on a two-and-a-half month expedition to the New Zealand outlying island named Campbell Island.

At the University of Alberta, Vitt was from 1970 to 1975 an assistant professor, from 1975 to 1980 an associate professor, and from 1980 to 2000 a full professor. He became in 1970 a curator at the University of Alberta's Cryptogamic Herbarium and has continued the curatorial appointment to the present. From 1992 to 2000 he was the director of the Devonian Botanic Garden, now called the University of Alberta Botanic Garden. From 2000 to 2011 at Southern Illinois University, he was a professor and chair of the plant biology program. He retired as professor emeritus in 2011. He was a visiting professor in 1971 at the University of Michigan Biological Station and in 1981 at the University of Minnesota and at the University of New South Wales.

Vitt has collected mosses not only in the United States and Canada, but also in the Canary Islands, Australia, New Zealand, Vanuatu, Fiji, Brazil, Peru, Sweden, Switzerland, the United Kingdom, Jamaica, China, Japan, and Asiatic Russia. He has been a co-collector with Richard Edward Andrus, Diana Gail Horton, and Timo Juhani Koponen. In July 1971 while collecting mosses on Devon Island, Vitt suffered two broken ribs from an encounter with a musk ox. In the winter of 1971–1972 he went to the Auckland Islands on a two-month expedition led by Henry Imshaug. On this expedition Vitt climbed a tree to escape an attack from a sea lion.

On September 4, 1966 in Madison, Missouri, he married Sandra Faye Mouser. She served as his office/lab manager and assisted him in organizational and editorial work. They have two sons.

Selected publications

Articles
  This 1968 article is "the first report of insects camouflaging their backsides with bryophytes."

Books and monographs

References

External links
 
 
  (many online links to Vitt's articles)

1944 births
Living people
Bryologists
20th-century American botanists
21st-century American botanists
Southeast Missouri State University alumni
University of Michigan alumni
Academic staff of the University of Alberta
Southern Illinois University faculty